Jupiter Christian School is a private Christian school in Jupiter, Florida. It was established in 1963 and serves approximately 896 students in pre K - 2 through 12th grade.

History
Jupiter Christian School opened in September 1963.

It is accredited by the Association of Christian Schools International and the Southern Association of Colleges and Schools Council on Accreditation and School Improvement. The school is also a member of Christian Schools of Palm Beach County and the National Council for Private School Accreditation.

Extracurricular activities
The school's athletic teams attend the Florida High School Athletic Association competition. Teams are fielded in baseball, basketball, cheer leading, cross country, football, golf, swimming, lacrosse, soccer, softball, track and field, tennis, volleyball, and wrestling.

State championship titles held by the school's teams include:
Football: 2007 (1B), 2008 (1B)
Wrestling 2006

References

External links

Case No.: SC05-1986

Christian schools in Florida
Educational institutions established in 1963
High schools in Palm Beach County, Florida
Nondenominational Christian schools in the United States
Private high schools in Florida
Private middle schools in Florida
Private elementary schools in Florida
1963 establishments in Florida
Jupiter, Florida